Rauni  (population 5000) is a village in the Ludhiana District of Punjab, India.

  
Villages in Ludhiana district

The surname “Benipal” has come from this village and expands to the villages near it.